Samuel Platt (1812 – May 5, 1887) was a Canadian brewer and politician. He was born in Ireland in 1812 and immigrated to  Canada in 1827.

He worked as  a clerk  at Enoch Turner's brewery  for four  years and then  erected  a distillery of his own at Berkeley and Front Streets.

Platt married a Miss Lockett in 1836.

He served as a councillor for St. Lawrence Ward from  1845 to 1851, followed by a two-year term as an alderman for St. David's Ward in 1853 and 1854.

In 1872, Platt was one of  four citizens appointed to the Water Commission, which supervised the construction of the city's waterworks before disbanding in 1877.

He was elected as an Independent to represent the federal riding  of Toronto East in 1875 and 1878.

Platt also served as a director of the Consumers Gas Company.

References

1812 births
1887 deaths
Independent MPs in the Canadian House of Commons
Members of the House of Commons of Canada from Ontario